Price County is a county in the U.S. state of Wisconsin. As of the 2020 census, the population was 14,054. Its county seat is Phillips.

History
Price County was created on March 3, 1879, when Wisconsin Governor William E. Smith signed legislation creating the county. The county was later organized in 1882. William T. Price (1824–1886), for whom Price County was named, was President of the Wisconsin Senate and an early logger in Price County; he later was elected to the U.S. Congress. The county was formed from portions of Chippewa and Lincoln counties.

The first white settler in what is now Price County was Major Isaac Stone, who located on the Spirit River in 1860 to engage in lumbering. Price County continues today to be a large producer of raw timber.

Geography
The highest natural point in Wisconsin, Timms Hill at 1,951 feet (595 m), is located in Price County.

Adjacent counties

 Ashland - northwest
 Iron - northeast
 Lincoln - southeast
 Oneida - east
 Rusk - west
 Sawyer - west
 Taylor - south
 Vilas - northeast

Major highways

  U.S. Highway 8
  Highway 13 (Wisconsin)
  Highway 70 (Wisconsin)
  Highway 86 (Wisconsin)
  Highway 102 (Wisconsin)
  Highway 111 (Wisconsin)
  Highway 182 (Wisconsin)

Railroads
Watco

Buses
Bay Area Rural Transit
List of intercity bus stops in Wisconsin

Airports
 KPBH - Price County Airport
 KPKF - Park Falls Municipal Airport
 5N2  - Prentice Airport

National protected area
 Chequamegon National Forest (part)

Demographics

2020 census
As of the census of 2020, the population was 14,054. The racial makeup of the county was 94.2% White, 0.9% Pacific Islander, 0.6% Native American, 0.5% Asian, 0.2% Black or African American, 0.5% from other races, and 3.1% from two or more races. Ethnically, the population was 1.3% Hispanic or Latino of any race.

2000 census

As of the census of 2000, there were 15,822 people, 6,564 households, and 4,417 families residing in the county.  The population density was 13 people per square mile (5/km2). There were 9,574 housing units at an average density of 8 per square mile (3/km2).  The racial makeup of the county was 98.22% White, 0.10% Black or African American, 0.60% Native American, 0.30% Asian, 0.03% Pacific Islander, 0.15% from other races, and 0.60% from two or more races.  0.73% of the population were Hispanic or Latino of any race. 44.4% were of German, 6.5% Norwegian, 5.9% Swedish, 5.4% Polish, 5.2% Irish and 5.0% Czech ancestry.

There were 6,564 households, out of which 28.90% had children under the age of 18 living with them, 56.50% were married couples living together, 6.60% had a female householder with no husband present, and 32.70% were non-families. 28.50% of all households were made up of individuals, and 14.50% had someone living alone who was 65 years of age or older. The average household size was 2.37 and the average family size was 2.91.

In the county, the population was spread out, with 23.80% under the age of 18, 5.80% from 18 to 24, 25.80% from 25 to 44, 25.70% from 45 to 64, and 18.80% who were 65 years of age or older. The median age was 42 years. For every 100 females, there were 101.00 males. For every 100 females age 18 and over, there were 99.00 males.

In 2017, there were 127 births, giving a general fertility rate of 71.4 births per 1000 women aged 15–44, the 13th highest rate out of all 72 Wisconsin counties. Additionally, there were fewer than five reported induced abortions performed on women of Price County residence in 2017.

Communities

Cities
 Park Falls
 Phillips (county seat)

Villages
 Catawba
 Kennan
 Prentice

Towns

 Catawba
 Eisenstein
 Elk
 Emery
 Fifield
 Flambeau
 Georgetown
 Hackett
 Harmony
 Hill
 Kennan
 Knox
 Lake
 Ogema
 Prentice
 Spirit
 Worcester

Census-designated place
 Ogema

Unincorporated communities

 Cranberry Lake
 Clifford (partial)
 Brantwood
 Dover
 Fifield
 Lugerville
 Pennington
 Spirit
 Worcester

Ghost towns/neighborhoods
 Coolidge
 Kaiser
 Kennedy
 Knox Mills
 Sassen

Politics

See also
 National Register of Historic Places listings in Price County, Wisconsin

References

External links
 Price County
 Price County map at Wisconsin Department of Transportation
 Price County Historical Society

 
1882 establishments in Wisconsin
Populated places established in 1882